The Zilwaukee Bridge is a high-level, segmental concrete bridge spanning the Saginaw River in the U.S. state of Michigan.

The current eight-lane structure, completed in 1988, is the second such bridge at this location, replacing a four-lane bascule bridge constructed in 1960. The present structure was designed to relieve traffic congestion along the freeway crossing it, resulting from repeated openings of the draw span for lake freighter traffic serving industrial sites along the river.

History

While the need for a replacement of the original structure became acute soon after it was completed, the construction of the current structure was also plagued with difficulties.

Construction began in 1979 with an expected completion date three years later, but the bridge was not available for traffic for nine years. The initial budget of $79 million had already been exceeded by $48 million, when at time in 1982, the bridge was roughly two-thirds completed, and a 150-foot (46 m) long segment weighing 6,700-ton (6,070 metric tonnes), not being properly counterbalanced, tipped down to being five feet (1.5 m) out of alignment, with the other end rising 3.5 feet (1.1 m). A pier footing cracked, presumably due to resulting stress. Once repairs were made, a new contractor was hired to complete the bridge once the initial contractor (Stevin Construction) and the state agreed to terminate their contract in exchange for both sides dropping their lawsuits over the accident. The new contractor developed a method of heating the concrete to allow construction during the winter. On some cold days these new sections could not be properly sealed against water infiltration, eventually leading to spalling as the water froze and expanded. Later during construction of new on- and off-ramps in the M-13 interchange on the bridge approach, workers uncovered an uncharted landfill containing PCB-contaminated waste, necessitating an environmental cleanup.

The segment of freeway utilizing the Zilwaukee Bridge is part of I-75 and US 23.

Interstate 675
I-675 was built, in part, to help traffic bypass the original drawbridge while the current high-level Zilwaukee Bridge was being proposed and constructed, in addition to providing better access into and through downtown Saginaw.  During bridge maintenance, I-675 is used as a detour route for traffic.

Maintenance
In April 2008, work crews replacing bridge bearings unexpectedly drilled into several reinforcing steel bars in the bridge. The $3.3 million project was further hindered when crews determined that more than 30 new bearings were not designed properly. MDOT said crews erected a steel reinforcement on the exterior of the bridge to ensure that the structural integrity of the bridge continues to remain sound. On October 21, 2008 the bridge opened up to north and southbound traffic once again.

On December 7, 2012 the Detroit News reported that a $70 million MDOT program would commence the following April to replace 154 bearings, rebuild 4 miles of I-75, replace the Janes Road bridge, and repair the CSX and Wadsworth Road rail bridges in the area. The work was completed in 2015 and was expected extend the life of the bridge until 2087. During 2014, special custom-made jacks were put into place as a stop-gap measure while bearings were replaced.

References

External links

Zilwaukee Bridge at Michigan Highways
 

Buildings and structures in Saginaw County, Michigan
Interstate 75
Bridges completed in 1988
Transportation in Saginaw County, Michigan
Road bridges in Michigan
Bridges on the Interstate Highway System
Bridges of the United States Numbered Highway System
U.S. Route 23
Concrete bridges in the United States
1988 establishments in Michigan